Judah and 22nd Avenue / Judah and 23rd Avenue stations are a pair of light rail stops on the Muni Metro N Judah line, located in the Sunset District neighborhood of San Francisco, California. The eastbound stop is located on Judah Street at 22nd Avenue, while westbound trains stop on Judah Street at 23rd Avenue. The stops opened with the N Judah line on October 21, 1928. The station has two short side platforms in the middle of Judah Street (traffic islands) where passengers board or depart from trains. The station is not accessible to people with disabilities.

In March 2014, Muni released details of the proposed implementation of their Transit Effectiveness Project (later rebranded MuniForward), which included a variety of stop changes for the N Judah line. Under that plan – which will be implemented as the N Judah Rapid Project – the stops will have their short boarding islands extended to accommodate longer trains.

References

External links 

SFMTA – Judah & 22nd Avenue, Judah & 23rd Avenue
SFBay Transit (unofficial) – Judah St & 22nd Ave, Judah & 23rd Ave

Muni Metro stations
Sunset District, San Francisco